Johnny Thompson (born 8 June 1983) is an Irish cricketer. He made his List A debut for North West Warriors in the 2017 Inter-Provincial Cup on 1 May 2017. He made his Twenty20 cricket debut for North West Warriors in the 2017 Inter-Provincial Trophy on 26 May 2017. He made his first-class debut for North West Warriors in the 2017 Inter-Provincial Championship on 20 June 2017.

References

External links
 

1983 births
Living people
Irish cricketers
North West Warriors cricketers
Place of birth missing (living people)